List of works of Bastien and Henry Prigent.
The sculptors or "Ymageurs", Bastien and Henry Prigent ran a workshop (atelier) in Landerneau, Brittany, France from 1527 to 1577 and records show that at least fifty parishes passed orders to them, these parishes spread across the dioceses of Léon and Cornouaille plus of course Plougonven in Trégor. The atelier is known for the work on the monumental calvaries of Pleyben and Plougonven, on the porches at Pencran, Landivisiau, Guipavas and Lampaul-Guimiliau, several crosses and smaller calvaries and a gisant. For much of their work they used Kersantite, The listing below gives details of these works.

The monumental calvaries
The Prigent atelier worked on the monumental calvaries at Plougonven see Calvary at Plougonven and Pleyben see Calvary at Pleyben. The Plougonven calvary was the first work to be inscribed with their names. An inscription reads "BASTIEN ET HENRY PRIGENT ESTOIET YMAGEURS 1554". The word "Ymageurs" was the description used for sculptors in this period in France. The Plougonven calvary is dedicated to Saint Yves and that at Pleyben to Saint Germain. The sculptor working in the Prigent atelier known as "Le compagnon de Pleyben" assisted the Prigents on parts of the Playben calvary.

The porches at Landivisau, Guivapas, Lampaul-Guimiliau and Pencran
The Prigent atelier are attributed with work on the great porches at Landivisiau, Guivapas, Lampaul-Guimiliau and Pencran. They also completed work on the porches at Le Tréhou, Trémaouézan, Commana, Ploudiry and Quéménéven. Details are:-

The porch at Landivisiau
The present Saint Thuriau church in Landivisiau was built between 1864 and 1865 replacing the earlier 16th-century building but the old church's porch and bell-tower were retained, fortunately so as they are both magnificent. The porch was dismantled and then re-erected in 1728 by Jean Perrot and Sébastien Roussel. The entrance to the porch comprises a semi-circular arch, with side buttresses and above the arch a pointed gable culminates in an elaborate lantern. Inside the porch are statues of the apostles, and a two-door entrance to the church has further decorated arches, with further statues on the wall as well as a tympanum. Unusually for porches in churches in the Élorn valley, the porch is accessed using ten steps. As at Pencran, Bastien Prigent created a series of piédroits and voussures depicting biblical and other scenes as decoration of the arch over the porch's entrance (the blocks of stone at the part of the arch near to ground level are the piédroits and the remaining wedge-shaped stones used in constructing an arch form the voussoirs.  Above the biblical scenes in the arch's piédroits are depictions of the four Evangelists and their attributes, with Saints Luke and John positioned on the left and Mark and Matthew positioned on the right and finally a "heavenly choir" of thirty one winged angels are shown floating in the clouds and praying, singing, playing various instruments or holding censers. Above the entrance arch is a gable in the Gothic style and on this the sculptors placed a statue depicting a female saint reading a book and another female saint higher up has her hands crossed against her chest.  The gable is also decorated with two lions supporting the blason of François de Tournemine.  Above the gable there is an ornate lantern with three niches. The central niche contains a statue of Saint Thuriau to whom the church is dedicated.  The two buttresses supporting the arch have niches containing statues of the four Evangelists each seated at a desk with their attributes at their side. The buttresses also hold a statue of the Virgin of the Annunciation and another depicting Saint Anne with the Virgin Mary. All these statues are by Bastien Prigent.  The inside of the porch is vaulted and is decorated with the blason of the Danycan family and Henry Prigent added statues of "Christ the Saviour" and the twelve apostles in niches each with an elaborate canopy. The heads of these apostles were damaged during the turmoil of the French revolution and bear signs of restoration and some of the attributes were destroyed which makes identification difficult. The arches around the two doors giving access to the church are in turn richly decorated with garlands of thistles ("chardon") and grapes and a series of statuettes in niches, these depicting Saint Yves, Saint Peter holding a book and a key, Saint Salomon the Breton king wearing armour, holding a sword and the royal crown, Saint Miliau carrying his head in his hands, Saint Thivisiau, a bishop, Saint Côme holding a vase containing medications, Saint Damien (Côme and Damien were brothers and both doctors martyred under Diocletian), and another bishop giving a blessing. On the left side angels hold a cartouche reading "ANNO.DOMINI.1554" and on the right the cartouche reads "LAN.MIL.VCC.L1111.FVST.FONDE.CESTE.PORTAL.ET.ESTOIENT.LORS.FABRIQVES.Y.MART(I)N.J.ABGRALL". Above the doors a tympanum depicts angels holding phylacteries on either side of a statue of Jesus Christ. The phylactery held by the three angels on the left side reads "MEMENTO.MEI/O.MATER.DEI/PAX VOBIS" and that held by three angels on the right reads "DOMVS MEA/SALVATOR MVNDI/ LETVS MARIA". There is an elaborate stoup on the wall between the two entrance doors.

Gallery of photographs-South porch of the Église Saint-Thuriau at Landivisiau

The porch at Guipavas
There was a reference to a church in Guipavas in as early as 1394 and the building was restored in 1563 and 1565. Hit by incendiary bombs in 1944 in the Allied push to take Brest from the occupying Germans, the church was subsequently rebuilt but there was enough left of the 1563 north porch to retain it and it has some sculptures and carvings attributed to the Prigent atelier including statues of the apostles and Jesus Christ in the porch interior, although eight of them were all decapitated during the turmoil of the 1789 French revolution, part of a nativity scene in the tympanum above the entrance arch and seven angels in the archivolt. The church was given the status of a parish church in 1618. The bell- tower was struck by lightning and destroyed in 1791 The north porch of the église Saint-Pierre et Saint-Paul has a three centred arch or "basket handle arch" (also called "anse de panier") and was made using the local Kersantite. The arch is decorated with carvings of leaves and grapes which emerge from the mouths of a dog on one side and a dragon on the other. In the tympanum above the door is what is left of a nativity scene; the heads of an ass and a cow poke out from the stable. The buttresses contain contemporary sculptures of Joseph and the Virgin Mary. In the voussures of the archivolt all that remain are seven angels either at prayer, swinging a censer, playing a musical instrument or holding phylacteries. These are by Henry Prigent as are the statue of Christ and the apostles in the porch interior.
Note: At the Chapelle Saint-Yves in Guipavas there is a statue of Saint Yves attributed to the Prigent atelier. It is located on the east wall to the left of the stained glass window.

The porch at Lampaul-Guimiliau
See also Lampaul-Guimiliau Parish close. The works at the Église Notre Dame porch attributed to the Prigent atelier are limited to the upper section of that porch. They are the statue of Saint Paul-Aurélien in a niche on the outside of the porch, a Saint Michel fighting a dragon situated below this niche and also the sculpture depicting the Virgin Mary and John the Evangelist at prayer with a small angel positioned between them on the top of the porch lantern. The sculptures depicting Saint Pol and Saint Michael are attributed to Bastien Prigent and those of the Virgin Mary, John the Evangelist and the angel are by Henry Prigent.

Images at Lampaul-Guimiliau

The porch at Pencran

The porch's entrance arch is of the "basket handle" type ("anse de panier") and the external voussure immediately around the rim of the arch is decorated with vine leaves and grapes and small carvings of people eating grapes or at play and some dogs and a bird. These carvings start on the left side emerging from the mouth of a lion and end on the right side entering the mouth of a dragon. Around the interior voussure the same themes are repeated but a pig replaces the dragon. Above this arch a large tympanum contains what is left of a nativity scene with the Virgin Mary and Joseph, who have lost their heads, on either side of the baby Jesus, and the protruding heads of the ass and the cow. Around the central arch of the entrance, a further two bands of voussures and piédroits are elaborately decorated with scenes from both Old and New Testament.  The piédroit is the stone at the bottom part of an arch up to the point when the arch begins to curve. The stones in the curved part of the arch are called voussures. The nine biblical scenes involves are thought to have been inspired by the Maître de Folgoët's porch at La Martyre. They start on the lower left side with the temptation of Eve, and we then move over to the right side and see an angel armed with a sword chasing Adam and Eve from the Garden of Eden. We continue to move from left to right and see Eve carrying the baby Abel in her arms whilst the baby Cain sleeps in a cot at her feet and then Adam at work in the fields. We next move to a scene showing Cain and Abel making their sacrifices. On the left Cain is not having great success and the smoke from his fire billows back into his eyes. His brother is having more success. We move next to a scene showing Cain murdering his brother. Next we see Noah's ark and Noah harvesting grapes and then fast a sleep having drunk too much wine. In the final scene from this sequence we see Cham trying to cover his father's nudity. After these biblical scenes there are depictions of the four Evangelists and their attributes. Mark and John are on the left and Luke and Matthew on the right. Finally the carvings are of a "heavenly" host of angels singing, praying and playing instruments; a celebration of the birth of Christ! Inside the porch the statues of the apostles are not by the Prigent atelier but the canopy is. There are also works by the Prigent atelier in niches in the buttress supporting the porch. A statue of Saint Anne teaching the Virgin Mary to read can be found in the right side niche of the right side buttress, a statue of Saint Suzanne can be found in the niche in the centre of the right side buttress and in a niche in the left side buttress is a statue of the Virgin Mary. By the west wall in the south transept there are the remains of a statue of Saint Sebastian attributed to the Prigent atelier and on the lawn a kneeling Mary Magdalene is by Bastien Prigent.

The porches at Le Tréhou, Trémaouézan, Commana, Ploudiry and Quéménéven
Works attributed to the Prigent brothers can be found in other church porches in the Élorn valley. There are works by Bastien Prigent in Le Tréhou, Trémaouézan, Commana and Ploudiry and by Henry Prigent in Quéménéven.  At Le Tréhou there is a statue by Bastien of Saint Pitère decorating the niche on the porch gable. The saint holds a book and a palm (see also Le Tréhou Parish close) It is at Le Tréhou that we can see Roland Doré's statues of the apostles in the porch interior.

At Trémaouézan's Église Notre-Dame (see Trémaouézan Parish close) the statue of Saint Trinité in the right side niche in the porch buttress on the right side is attributed to Bastien Prigent. God the Holy Father is depicted sitting with the body of his dead son across his knees. At Commana, see Commana Parish close Bastien Prigent is attributed with the statues of the Virgin Mary (Vierge de la Nativitė) and Joseph (Saint Joseph de la Nativitė) placed on the porch buttresses. Joseph stands with his pilgrim's stick held across his chest. The Virgin Mary is depicted at prayer. At Ploudiry, see Ploudiry Parish close, Bastien Prigent was responsible for the statue of Saint Sebastian in the right side buttress.

At Quéménéven, Henry Prigent was the sculptor of the statue of Saint Lawrence who carries a closed book and a gridiron to remind us of the nature of his martyrdom.

Crosses and calvaries where parts are attributed to the Prigent atelier
Emmanuelle Le Seac'h reckons that there are 17 calvaries in the region that have been re-erected using sculptures from various workshops. Some of these are described below:-

Miscellaneous

Note on the sculptor Fayet
Apart from "Le compagnon de Pleyben", who worked with the Prigent brothers on the monumental calvary at Pleyben, the sculptor known as Fayet also worked in the Prigent atelier and is best known for his work on the Calvary at Lopérec. Fayet worked with the atelier from 1552 to 1563. His style of sculpting was so similar to the Prigent brothers that it is sometimes difficult to tell their work apart. Like the two brothers he often added three tears to the faces of his subjects and their faces were oval in shape as were those of the Prigents.

Other works by Fayet include those listed below.

Fayet also executed several sculptures of angels with their wings spread ("anges aux ailes dėployėes") which were positioned on either side of the crucified Christ and were collecting his blood into chalices. Examples are at Briec-de-l'Odet for the Saint-Adrien calvary, at Landudal, in the cemetery at Plounéour-Ménez, the Sainte-Barbe chapel at Ploéven, the ėglise at Plozévet and on the Kernaliou cross in Trégourez.

Further reading
"Sculpteurs sur pierre en Basse-Bretagne. Les Ateliers du XVe au XVIIe Siècle" by Emmanuelle LeSeac'h. Published by Presses Universitaires de Rennes.

References

Pleyben
Buildings and structures in Finistère